The 1983 UK & Ireland Greyhound Racing Year was the 57th year of greyhound racing in the United Kingdom and Ireland.

Roll of honour

Summary
The National Greyhound Racing Club (NGRC) released the annual returns, with totalisator turnover slightly down at £61,932,148 and attendances also slightly down recorded at 4,245,995 from 5443 meetings. Track tote retention was 17.5%.

Im Slippy, a white and blue brindle dog was voted Irish Greyhound of the Year, he won the 1983 English Greyhound Derby at White City. Yankee Express, a brindle dog, trained by George Curtis was voted Greyhound of the Year after winning a second successive Scurry Gold Cup title at Slough, the October 1980 whelp had performed well in the Derby and also won the Pall Mall Stakes.

Tracks
After failing to secure new premises at Oxleaze and Churchdown, the decision was made to close Gloucester & Cheltenham Stadium, the final meeting was held on 22 October. Many of the trainers and greyhounds were accommodated by the Swindon and Bristol Racing Manager's Bill Hiscock and Ken Whitrow respectively. Gloucester's leading trainer Janet Dickenson joined Bristol. Later in the year ADT (British Car Auctions) purchased Swindon and used its large car park as a base for their sales.

Ladbrokes sold Brough Park to Glassedin Greyhounds Ltd, headed by James Glass, father of female trainer Jane Glass. Cambridge had their NGRC licence cancelled and reverted once again to independent status leaving a some top trainers looking for a new attachment. Joe Cobbold went private and would eventually put the Utopia kennels in the hands of son and daughter in law, Trevor and Pam. Linda Mullins took up a position at Crayford, Theo Mentzis and Natalie Savva both went to Milton Keynes and Paddy Hancox moved from Perry Barr to Hall Green. Ayr Greyhound Stadium opened on 6 August.

News
White City trainer Randy Singleton retired and was replaced by Ray Peacock and Frank Baldwin. Walthamstow Racing Manager Ray Spalding left to be replaced by Tony Smith. Seeding for open races was controversially scrapped as a recommendation from the Greyhound Racing Association's chief racing manager Bob Rowe, there was an opinion that segregating wide runners and railers in trap draws favoured those seeded wide. 
 
Five track records fell on the English Greyhound Derby final night, including that for the Derby distance when Hay Maker Mack became the first dog ever to break the 29-second barrier, posting 28.95 seconds. Hay Maker Mack had won a Derby heat before being knocked out and his racing career ended soon afterwards, when he sustained a broken hock during the Essex Vase at Romford. 

Decoy Lassie finished runner up in the Cesarewitch at Belle Vue but took consolation from winning the Steward's Cup and Cearns Memorial.  

Whisper Wishes, an August 1981 black dog, son of Sand Man bred in Ireland by Mrs G. Naylor out of her brood bitch, Micklem Drive was put with Maidstone's Charlie Coyle. After a year that consisted of only 15 races, winning six of them including the Courage Select Stakes at Wembley he came into the ownership of Irishman John Duffy. Duffy pencilled in the following year's Derby for his hound.

Ireland
The Boyne Valley Greyhound Stadium in Navan is suspended by the Bord na gCon after they discovered that it owed more than £5,000 in unpaid prize money. Irish star Supreme Tiger trained by Matt O'Donnell broke a hock when preparing for the Anglo-Irish International and was retired

English Derby champion Im Slippy returned to Northern Ireland and won the Guinness National Sprint at Dunmore remaining undefeated throughout the event and winning the final by four lengths from Ring Beacon in 29.30 seconds. He became one of a select few to win a Classic event on both sides of the Irish Sea. After being retired he went on to prove himself one of the most influential stud greyhounds of modern times.

Belvedere Bran won the £25,000 Carroll's 1983 Irish Greyhound Derby.
Litter sisters Kerogue Nella and Kerogue Sarah finished first and second during the running of the Irish TV Trophy.

Principal UK races

Totalisator returns

The totalisator returns declared to the National Greyhound Racing Club for the year 1983 are listed below.

References 

Greyhound racing in the United Kingdom
Greyhound racing in the Republic of Ireland
UK and Ireland Greyhound Racing Year
UK and Ireland Greyhound Racing Year
UK and Ireland Greyhound Racing Year
UK and Ireland Greyhound Racing Year